The 2020 Northeast Conference men's soccer season will be the 40st season of men's varsity soccer in the conference. The season was slated to begin on August 29, 2020 and conclude on November 14, 2020. Due to the ongoing COVID-19 pandemic, the season was postponed, and is set to begin in Spring of 2021.

Teams

Stadiums and locations

Spring 2021 season 
The season will start on February 22 and end on April 8, with each team playing 8 conference matches.  The 2020 NEC Championship match will be contested the week of April 12-18 with the No. 1 seed hosting the No. 2 seed to determine the conference’s automatic qualifier to the NCAA Tournament.

Preseason poll 
The preseason poll will be released in December 2020 or January 2021.

Preseason national polls 
The preseason national polls were originally to be released in July and August 2020. Only CollegeSoccerNews.com released a preseason poll for 2020.

Early season tournaments 
Early season tournaments will be announced in late Fall 2020 and winter 2021.

References 

 
2020 NCAA Division I men's soccer season
Association football events postponed due to the COVID-19 pandemic